WR 25 (HD 93162) is a binary star system in the turbulent star-forming region the Carina Nebula, about 6,800 light-years from Earth. It contains a Wolf-Rayet star and a hot luminous companion and is a member of the Trumpler 16 cluster. The name comes from the Catalogue of Galactic Wolf–Rayet Stars.

Spectrum
WR 25 was recognised as a Wolf–Rayet star in the 19th century, because of its brightness and a spectrum dominated by broad emission lines.  The spectrum contains lines of hydrogen and is intermediate between a classical WN (Wolf-Rayet) star and an O-type supergiant.  This led to early reports that it was a binary, for example a WN7 star plus an O7 star.  It has also been described as WN7 + abs (meaning a Wolf-Rayet star with absorption lines of unknown origin) and WN6ha.  With the introduction of specific classifications for hot slash stars, WR 25 was assigned the spectral type O2.5If*/WN6.  This recognises the presence of nitrogen, the intrinsic weakness of many emission lines, and the presence of some helium and hydrogen absorption lines.  The classification represents a fine gradation of weaker emission and stronger absorption than a WN6ha spectral type.  Any contribution to the spectrum from the companion cannot be clearly detected.

Properties

The primary star of the WR 25 system is approximately 2.4 million times brighter than the Sun and illuminates the far southern end of the Trumpler 16 cluster.  The model used to derive the stellar parameters is unsuitable for use in binary systems with the authors noting that the companion contributes more than 15% of the system luminosity, so the luminosity is highly uncertain.  Earlier estimates based on measurements of the ionising flux produced values around 1.5 million times the sun, with correspondingly lower estimates for other physical data.

The companion is assumed to be a young hot massive star, similar to other known WR+O or WR+WR binaries.  It has been reported as an O4 supergiant, but later measurements are still uncertain about the exact spectral type. Colliding stellar winds between two such hot luminous stars produce the hard X-rays that led to suspicion about the binary status long before the 208-day orbital period was detected.

Although very luminous, WR 25 is beyond naked-eye visibility due to heavy dust extinction of clouds in the nebula, and because much of the emitted radiation is in the ultraviolet. With an absolute magnitude of −6.98 at a distance of 1970 parsecs, it would be visible to the naked eye with a stellar magnitude of 4.49 if there were nothing in the way, rather than the actual 8.80. It has been observed in X-rays and infra-red.

WR 25 lies at the western limit of the Trumpler 16 star cluster, part of Carina OB1, one of the largest stellar associations in the Milky Way Galaxy. Because of its extreme luminosity it greatly affects its stellar environment, seen in the thin long arcs and filaments moving away from the star, including the Finger Nebula.

See also
R136a1
Pistol Star
WR 102ka
LBV 1806-20

References

Carina Nebula
Wolf–Rayet stars
Carina (constellation)
093162
O-type supergiants
Spectroscopic binaries
J10441038-5943111
Durchmusterung objects
TIC objects